James A. Robertson (March 8, 1901 – December 31, 1974) was an American football player and coach.

Playing career

Carnegie Tech
After playing high school football in Allegheny, Pennsylvania, Robertson was expected to go to West Point. Instead, he went on to college and played college football at Carnegie Institute of Technology in Pittsburgh, Pennsylvania (now called Carnegie Mellon University). Under coach Walter Steffen, the squad played teams such as Notre Dame, Georgia Tech, Purdue, Michigan State, and USC. Robertson was team captain and proved instrumental to several key victories in school history. He is considered one of the best players in the history of the school.

Akron Pros
After college, Robertson played for the Akron Pros of the National Football League (NFL) in 1924 and 1925. under head coaches Wayne Brenkert and Scotty Bierce He played for 16 games for Akron, recording statistics on both offense and defense.

Coaching career
Robertson was the 16th head football coach at Geneva College located in Beaver Falls, Pennsylvania and he held that position for the 1933 season-the original plan was for him to coach at Geneva for only one year. His coaching record at Geneva was 6–3 Robertson's first game as head coach was a 47 to 0 victory over the California Teacher's College in Pennsylvania. After one season, Robertson was expected to be retained as head coach as late as January 1934.

Head coaching record

References

External links
 

1901 births
1974 deaths
American football fullbacks
American football halfbacks
Akron Pros players
Carnegie Mellon Tartans football players
Geneva Golden Tornadoes football coaches
Sportspeople from Aberdeen
People from Allegheny County, Pennsylvania
Coaches of American football from Pennsylvania
Players of American football from Pennsylvania